Sara Raposeiro (born ) is a Portuguese female artistic gymnast, representing her nation at international competitions. 

She competed at the 2014 Summer Youth Olympics, and at world championships, including the 2015 World Artistic Gymnastics Championships in Glasgow.

References

External links

1999 births
Living people
Portuguese female artistic gymnasts
Place of birth missing (living people)
Gymnasts at the 2014 Summer Youth Olympics